Hurricane was the second of a pair of steam locomotives (the other being Thunderer) built for the Great Western Railway (GWR) by R. & W. Hawthorn & Co. whose design was very different from other locomotives. In order to meet Isambard Kingdom Brunel's strict specifications, a 2-2-2 frame carried the 'engine', while the boiler was on a separate six-wheeled frame.

The locomotive was delivered to the GWR on 6 October 1838 and ceased work in December 1839 after running for just 10,527 miles. After withdrawal the boiler was used on a new Pyracmon Class goods locomotive, Bacchus.

See also
GWR Thunderer locomotive - the other Hawthorn locomotive
GWR Haigh Foundry locomotives - further geared locomotives

References

 
 

Hurricane
Broad gauge (7 feet) railway locomotives
2-2-2 locomotives
Early steam locomotives
Steam locomotives of Great Britain
Hawthorn locomotives
Railway locomotives introduced in 1838
Scrapped locomotives